Mir Ayaz (also Romanized as Mīr Āyāz) is a village in Dehdasht-e Sharqi Rural District, in the Central District of Kohgiluyeh County, Kohgiluyeh and Boyer-Ahmad Province, Iran. At the 2006 census, its population was 98, in 17 families.

References 

Populated places in Kohgiluyeh County